ISO 3166-2:GL is the entry for Greenland in ISO 3166-2, part of the ISO 3166 standard published by the International Organization for Standardization (ISO), which defines codes for the names of the principal subdivisions (e.g., provinces or states) of all countries coded in ISO 3166-1.

Currently for Greenland, ISO 3166-2 codes are defined for 5 municipalities. The Northeast Greenland National Park and the Thule Air Base, which are unincorporated and not part of any municipality, are not listed.

Each code consists of two parts, separated by a hyphen. The second part is two letters.

Current codes
Subdivision names are listed as in the ISO 3166-2 standard published by the ISO 3166 Maintenance Agency (ISO 3166/MA).

ISO 639-1 codes are used to represent subdivision names in the following administrative languages:
 (kl): Kalaallisut

Click on the button in the header to sort each column.

Changes
The following changes to the entry have been announced by the ISO 3166/MA since the first publication of ISO 3166-2 in 1998. ISO stopped issuing newsletters in 2013.

See also
 Subdivisions of Greenland
 FIPS region codes of Greenland

External links
 ISO Online Browsing Platform: GL
 Communes of Greenland, Statoids.com

2:GL
ISO 3166-2
Greenland geography-related lists